Sonny, Please is a 2006 album by jazz saxophonist Sonny Rollins. It was released on the Doxy label, and features performances by Rollins, trombonist Clifton Anderson, guitarist Bobby Broom, bassist Bob Cranshaw, drummers Steve Jordan and Joe Corsello, and percussionist Kimati Dinizulu. It is the final studio session Rollins recorded before retiring from public performance in 2012.

Reception
The Allmusic review by Jeff Tamarkin awarded the album 3.5 stars, stating: "Most of his playing here is relatively easygoing. Rollins still enjoys taking it to the limit, just not as often as he once did. He doesn't need to, though; with nothing left to prove, he can afford to stand back and just enjoy being Sonny Rollins."

Track listing
All compositions by Sonny Rollins except as indicated
 "Sonny, Please" - 7:59
 "Someday I'll Find You" (Noël Coward) - 9:53
 "Nishi" - 7:52
 "Stairway to the Stars" - (Matty Malneck, Mitchell Parish, Frank Signorelli) - 5:14
 "Remembering Tommy" - 7:42
 "Serenade (Ballet Les Millions d'Arlequin)" (Riccardo Drigo, Mario) - 8:18
 "Park Palace Parade" - 7:29

Personnel
Sonny Rollins - tenor saxophone
Clifton Anderson - trombone
Bobby Broom - guitar
Bob Cranshaw - electric and acoustic bass
Steve Jordan - drums
Kimati Dinizulu - percussion
Joe Corsello - drums

References

Sonny Rollins albums
2006 albums